Signal to Noise is the fifth studio album by the Norwegian progressive rock band White Willow. This is the first White Willow album to feature Trude Eidtang on vocals.

Track listing
 "Night Surf" (Holm-Lupo) – 4:12
 "Splinters" (Holm-Lupo) – 8:36
 "Ghosts" (Frøislie, Holm-Lupo, Walthinsen) – 5:48
 "Joyride" (Holm-Lupo) – 4:18
 "The Lingering" (Holm-Lupo) – 9:25
 "The Dark Road" (Holm-Lupo) – 4:17
 "Chrome Dawn" (Holm-Lupo) – 7:12
 "Dusk City" (Holm-Lupo, Walthinsen) – 6:05
 "Ararat" (Holm-Lupo) – 1:35

Personnel
 Trude Eidtang – vocals
 Jacob Holm-Lupo – electric guitar, acoustic guitar, sitar, E-bow, keyboards 
 Lars Fredrik Frøislie – Hammond organ, mellotron, synthesizer, electric piano, clavinet, grand piano
 Marthe Berger Walthinsen – bass, cymbal
 Aage Moltke Schou – drums, percussion, glockenspiel
 Ketil Vestrum Einarsen – woodwind
 Brynjar Dambo – engineer (flute & percussion overdubs)
 Luca Kleve-Ruud – photography
 Tommy Hansen – mixing

References

2006 albums
White Willow (band) albums